Massimiliano Caputo (born September 10, 1980 in Naples) is a former Italian professional footballer who last played forward for Foligno.

Caputo spent the 2001–02 season on loan at Scottish club Livingston. He didn't score a league goal in 21 games but did score four goals in the Scottish League Cup; scoring twice against East Fife and twice against Aberdeen.

References

1980 births
Living people
Italian footballers
Brescia Calcio players
Ascoli Calcio 1898 F.C. players
U.C. AlbinoLeffe players
Italian expatriate footballers
Expatriate footballers in Scotland
Scottish Premier League players
Livingston F.C. players
Serie A players
Serie B players
U.S. Salernitana 1919 players
S.S. Juve Stabia players
U.S. Catanzaro 1929 players
Atletico Roma F.C. players
F.C. Matera players
A.S.D. Città di Foligno 1928 players
Italian expatriate sportspeople in Scotland
Association football forwards